Sergey Savin or Sergei Savin may refer to:

 Sergey Savin (volleyball) (born 1988), Russian volleyball player
 Sergei Savin (singer), Russian singer
 Sergei Savin (football), Kazakhstani football player (competed at the 1992 Kazakhstan Cup Final)